The headwater darter (Etheostoma lawrencei) is a species of freshwater ray-finned fish, a darter from the subfamily Etheostomatinae, part of the family Percidae, which also contains the perches, ruffes and pikeperches. It is endemic to the eastern United States where it is found in Kentucky and Tennessee in the upper Green River system down to the Mud River, in the Cumberland River and upper Salt River systems. Males of this species can reach a length of  SL while females only reach . The headwater darter was first formally described in 2002 by Patrick A. Ceas and Brooks M. Burr With the type locality given as Koger Creek, which is in the drainage of the Wolf River, about 0.8 kilometers northwest of Rolan, Kentucky along  Kentucky Route 415 at the confluence of McIver Creek in Clinton County.

Etymology
The specific name honors the American ichthyologist Lawrence M. Page of the Florida Museum of Natural History.

References

Etheostoma
Taxa named by Patrick A. Ceas
Taxa named by Brooks M. Burr
Fish described in 2002